"She Move It Like" is a song by Badshah from the album ONE. The song features Warina Hussain, released by Sony Music India on 10 December 2018.

Background 
The song was released as a single from the album ONE (Original Never Ends). Sung and penned by Badshah. Music video of the song features afghan actress Warina Hussain. The song was released by Sony Music India on 10 December 2018 via YouTube and other music streaming services.

Reception 
The song was very popular at the time of its release. It's music video crossed 11 million views in a day. As of January 2021 it has over 400 million views on YouTube.

References

External links 
 

2018 songs
Punjabi-language songs